"Valentine Girl" is a 1990 ballad single by New Kids on the Block, with lead vocals by Danny Wood and Jordan Knight. In America, it is featured on the B-side to "Step by Step", and was issued as an airplay-only track. However, the song was officially released as a single internationally.

The song reached #15 in Japan on the Oricon Singles Chart.

Versions
"Valentine Girl" [Album Version] 4:00
"Valentine Girl" [Radio Version] 3:53
"Valentine Girl" [The C&C Quiet Storm Mix] 5:09

References

1990 singles
New Kids on the Block songs
Oricon International Singles Chart number-one singles
Columbia Records singles
Songs written by Candice Nelson (songwriter)
Song recordings produced by Maurice Starr
1989 songs